1st Army of the West may refer to:
 First Western Army, created in 1810 as part of the reorganisation of the Imperial Russian Army, was intended as a defense against the north-western part of the Empire from the expected invasion by Napoleon
 First Army Division West is a division of the First United States Army activated in 2007

See also 
 First Army (disambiguation)
 Army of the Tennessee, a Union army in the Western Theater of the American Civil War, sometimes described as the "Army of West Tennessee"
 Polish Armed Forces in the West, formed to fight alongside the Western Allies against Nazi Germany and its allies during WWII